French Australians, some of whom refer to themselves as Huguenots, are Australian citizens or residents of French ancestry, or French-born people who reside in Australia. According to the 2011 Census, there were 110,399 people of French descent in Australia and 24,675 French-born people residing in the country at the time of the census, representing an increase of 28.6 percent compared to the 2006 Census. The largest French Australian community is in the state of New South Wales, where they number 8,936 people, many of whom reside in Sydney.

Demography

According to the 2006 Australian census, 98,332 Australians (or 0.47% of the population) claim French ancestry, either alone or with another ancestry. Of these, 19,186 were born in France and 12,735 of them had since acquired Australian citizenship.

8,281 (or 43%) of the residents born in France had arrived in Australia in 1979 or earlier.

History

Bruni d'Entrecasteaux, Jean-Michel Huon de Kermadec, Lapérouse, Louis Antoine de Bougainville, Jules Dumont d'Urville, Nicolas Baudin, François Péron and Marc-Joseph Marion du Fresne were some of the early European explorers to reach the continent. Francis Barrallier explored the Blue Mountains.

Many Australians with French ancestry are descended from Huguenot refugees. Some of the earliest Huguenots to arrive in Australia held prominent positions in English society, notably Jane Franklin and Charles La Trobe.

Others who came later were from poorer Huguenot families. They migrated to Australia from England in the nineteenth and early twentieth centuries to escape the poverty in the East End of London, notably in the Huguenot enclaves of Spitalfields and Bethnal Green. Their impoverishment had been brought about by the effect of the Industrial Revolution, which caused the collapse of the Huguenot-dominated silk-weaving industry.

A number of French orders of priests, nuns and brothers have contributed to the Catholic Church in Australia. They included the teaching orders of the De La Salle Brothers, Marist Brothers and Marist Sisters. The prominent school St Joseph's College, Hunters Hill was founded by the French Marist Brother Emilian Pontet in 1881. The Marist Fathers staffed parishes and conducted missionary activities in the South Pacific. The Missionaries of the Sacred Heart, based in Kensington, New South Wales, ran missions in remote Australia and New Guinea.

French architectural influence is still visible in Hunters Hill, not only in church buildings but also but in private houses built by the unusually large number of French settlers in the suburb.

The largest post-war increase in French migration to Australia came during the 1960s and 1970s; unlike many other European countries, France did not establish a migration scheme in the immediate post-war period due to chronic underemployment, despite Australia seeing the French as some of the most desirable immigrants to obtain during that era.

Since that time, there has only been a small flow of French immigrants to Australia. Many people in the French-Australian community now originate from French overseas territories, especially New Caledonia.

Culture
Today, the Brisbane French Festival, held over the Bastille Day weekend, is Australia's biggest French festival. Participants include both French-born Australians and Australians of more distant French ancestry.

Alliance Française has an active presence in most Australian cities, teaching the French language, holding cultural events such as Beaujolais Nouveau festivals and sponsoring the nation's annual French film festival. SBS has also done much to increase the popularity of French cinema and culture with Australian audiences, though Hollywood still predominates with mainstream audiences.

Some Australians of French Huguenot descent have completely assimilated into the country's predominantly Anglo-Saxon culture but most still quietly but tenaciously hold on to as many aspects as they can of their French heritage and identify themselves very much as Huguenots, even hundreds of years after being exiled. The Huguenot Society of Australia does much to encourage Australian Huguenots to embrace their cultural heritage and provides genealogical research services.

French cuisine has influenced the nation with French-inspired cafes, restaurants and boulangeries to be found in most major cities. French immigrant chefs, particularly those who appear on television, have done much to promote French cooking and food philosophy, including a growing understanding of the concept of terroir.

The French Benevolent Society has an active presence in the nation, providing a support network for elderly and incapacitated French Australians.

Most of the French-born people in Australia are Roman Catholics and the Reformed Church of France (Église Réformée de France) is yet to establish a presence in the country, despite the vibrant group of Australians of Huguenot descent. However, Taizé-style services are becoming increasingly popular with both Roman Catholics and Protestants from a variety of denominations. Taizé provides one of the key grassroots ecumenical movements in the nation.

Education 
French international schools in Australia include:
 Lycée Condorcet (Sydney)
 Telopea Park School (Canberra)
 Section Française de Caulfield Junior College (Melbourne)

See also 
 Alliance française
 Australia–France relations
 Bretons
 Caldoche
 Canadian Australians
 Dragonnade
 European Australians
 Europeans in Oceania
 French diaspora
 History of France
 Huguenot cross
 Huguenot
 Immigration to Australia
 List of Huguenots
 Reformed Church of France
 Religion in France
 Revocation of the Edict of Nantes
 Taizé Community

References

External links
 French Embassy
 France in Australia
 French Benevolent Society
 Huguenot Society of Australia
 Alliance Française (Brisbane Branch)
 French Schools in Australia
 French Australia Chamber of Commerce and Industry
 French Association of the North Shore (Sydney)
 Eglise Réformée de France
 French Connection: Early French Explorers of Tasmania
 Tasmania's Historic French Gardens
 Tassie's French Connection
 France in Tasmania
 Napoleon Bonaparte: Notable Australian Connections
 How Very French
 History of the Huguenots
 French culture in Australia
  (French in Sydney)

European Australian
Australia
 
 
French-Australian culture